Pride is a 2007 American biographical film released by Lionsgate Entertainment on March 23, 2007. Loosely based upon the true story of Philadelphia swim coach James "Jim" Ellis, Pride stars Terrence Howard, Bernie Mac, and Kimberly Elise. The film was directed by Sunu Gonera.

The film centers on Jim Ellis (Terrence Howard) and grouchy but caring janitor Elston (Bernie Mac). The two have a short-lived rivalry before becoming good friends.

Plot
In 1974, college-educated Jim Ellis is having a hard time finding employment. While struggling to find something better, Jim, a former competitive swimmer, works at the decrepit Marcus Foster Recreation Center in a poor neighborhood of Philadelphia. His job is to prepare the foreclosure of the Center, causing friction with Elston, the janitor whose job may disappear. The Center includes a dilapidated swimming pool, which Ellis rehabilitates. One day, Jim invites a group of black teens in for a swim. Andre, Hakim, Reggie, Puddin’ Head, and Walt prove to be fairly capable swimmers and with a few pointers, could become great swimmers. In parallel, Jim develops a romantic interest in Hakim's sister and guardian who wants him to attend school before pool.

With some help from Elston, Jim decides to try to save the swimming pool by starting the city's first all African-American swim team, the "PDR team" for both Pride, Determination, Resilience and Philadelphia Department of Recreation. Once they are joined by Willie, a female swimmer more talented than any of the boys, the prospects of competing against much more experienced white teams begin to improve. However, Black swimmers are not welcome everywhere and the team has to fight overtly racist opposition and treachery, which is what Jim already experienced when he was competing 10 years ago. Throughout their struggles in and out of the swimming pool, Jim and Elston encourage and mentor the kids, helping them not only to become successful at swimming but also in their struggles against prejudice, crime, and poverty.

Cast

Reception

Critical response
Pride was met with mixed reviews from critics, with a 47% approval rating on Rotten Tomatoes based on 111 reviews, with an average score of 5.50/10. The website's critics consensus reads: "Pride features a typically stellar performance from Terrence Howard, but ultimately falls victim to its over usage of sports movie clichés." On Metacritic, the film has a score of 55 based on 27 reviews, indicating "mixed or average reviews".

The New York Times critic Matt Zoller Seitz noted that the film "illustrates the adaptability and limitations of the sports movie," but concluded that when the film's "sinewy young idealists glide through water to the tune of "I'll Take You There," the heart still leaps." 

In his stand-up shows, comedian Bill Burr has spoofed the film, calling it as an example of the overabundance of films about white-on-black racism with continuously lower stakes.

Accolades

Notes

External links

2007 films
2000s buddy drama films
2000s coming-of-age drama films
2000s teen drama films
2000s sports drama films
African-American films
American buddy drama films
American coming-of-age drama films
American sports drama films
American teen drama films
Films scored by Aaron Zigman
Films set in the 1970s
Films set in 1974
Films set in Philadelphia
Films shot in New Orleans
Lionsgate films
Drama films based on actual events
Sports films based on actual events
Swimming films
African-American biographical dramas
Biographical films about sportspeople
Biographical films about educators
Films about racism in the United States
Cultural depictions of swimmers
2007 directorial debut films
2007 drama films
2000s English-language films
2000s American films